Leo Delaney (1879 or 1885–1920) was an American stage and silent film actor. He was born in Vermont and died in New York City, a victim of pneumonia. A popular early film actor, he began in 1907 with the Vitagraph Company in New York and spent the majority of his career with them.

Select filmography

Foul Play; or, A False Friend (1907)*short
The Wrong Flat; or, A Comedy of Errors (1907)*short
Launcelot and Elaine (1909)*short
Rose Leaves (1910)*short
Ransomed; or, A Prisoner of War (1910)*short
The Telephone (1910)*short
Jean Goes Fishing (1910)*short
Love, Luck and Gasoline (1910)*short
A Tin-Type Romance (1910)*short
Jean Rescues (1911)*short
The League of Mercy (1911)*short
A Tale of Two Cities (1911)*short
Betty Becoming a Maid (1911)*short
Proving His Love; or, The Ruse of a Beautiful Woman (1911)*short
The Stumbling Block (1911)*short
Tested by the Flag (1911)*short
Cherry Blossoms (1911)*short
The Child Crusoes (1911)*short
By Woman's Wit (1911)*short
In the Philippines; or, By the Campfire's Flicker (1911)*short
The Answer of the Roses (1911)*short
The Cabin Boy (1911)*short
Madge of the Mountains (1911)*short
Their Charming Mama (1911)*short
 Vanity Fair (1911)*short
A Reformed Santa Claus (1911)*short
Testing His Courage (1911)*short
The Meeting of the Ways (1912)*short
Love Will Find a Way (1912)*short
Where the Money Went (1912)*short
Her Boy (1912)*short
The Love of John Ruskin (1912)*short
The Governor Who Had a Heart (1912)*short
The Unknown Violinist (1912)*short
At Scrogginses' Corner (1912)*short
Old Love Letters (1912)*short
The Days of Terror; or, In the Reign of Terror (1912)*short
The Extension Table (1912)*short
Fate's Awful Jest (1912)*short
The Money Kings (1912)*short
A Lively Affair (1912)*short
The Light of St. Bernard (1912)
The Adventure of the Italian Model (1912)*short
The Signal Fire (1912)*short
As You Like It (1912)*short
None But the Brave Deserve the Fair (1912)*short
The Mills of the Gods (1912)*short
The Awakening of Bianca (1912)*short
Days of Terror (1912)*short
The Volunteer Strike Breakers (1913)*short
The Vengeance of Durand; or, The Two Portraits (1913)*short
The Skull (1913)*short
Just Show People (1913)*short
Mr. Ford's Temper (1913)*short
Tim Grogan's Foundling (1913)*short
O'Hara's Godchild (1913)*short
The One Good Turn (1913)*short
The Mouse and the Lion (1913)*short
O'Hara and the Youthful Prodigal (1913)*short
A Window on Washington Park (1913)*short
His Life for His Emperor (1913)*short
Bunny and the Bunny Hug (1913)*short
The Heart of Mrs. Robins (1913)*short
His Tired Uncle (1913)*short
The Silver Cigarette Case (1913)*short
Arriet's Baby (1913)*short
Solitaires (1913)*short
O'Hara as a Guardian Angel (1913)*short
Better Days (1913)*short
When Glasses Are Not Glasses (1913)*short
The Other Woman (1913)*short
Under the Daisies; or, As a Tale That Is Told (1913)*short
The Doctor's Secret (1913)*short
The Next Generation (1913)*short
Father's Hatband (1913)*short
His Silver Bachelorhood (1913)*short
An Elopement at Home (1913)*short
Fanny's Conspiracy (1913)*short
The Blue Rose (1913)*short
The Honorable Algernon (1913)*short
Officer John Donovan (1913)*short
The Vavasour Ball (1914)*short
The Slightly Worn Gown (1915)*short
The Island of Regeneration (1915)
For Another's Crime (1915)*short
Hearts to Let (1915)*short
The Millionaire's Hundred Dollar Bill (1915)*short
The Radium Thieves (1915)*short
The Return of Maurice Donnelly (1915)*short
The Way of the Transgressor (1915)*short
Life's Yesterdays (1915)*short
The Tigress (1915)*short
Hearts Ablaze (1915)*short
The Butterfly's Lesson (1915)*short
Wasted Lives (1915)*short
The Flower of the Hills (1915)*short
The Secret Seven (1916)*short
 The Surprises of an Empty Hotel (1916)
Beaned by a Beanshooter (1916)*short
The Vital Question (1916)
Susie Snowflake (1916)
Whoso Findeth a Wife (1916)
Pride and the Devil (1917)
Love's Law (1917)
The Slacker (1917)
The Great Victory, Wilson or the Kaiser? The Fall of the Hohenzollerns (1919)
False Gods (1919)
The Moonshine Trail (1919)
Circumstantial Evidence (1920)
The Unseen Witness (1920)
The Scrap of Paper (1920)
The Wall Street Mystery (1920)
A Flash in the Dark (1922)*short (posthumous)

References

External links

allmovie
kinotv.com

19th-century births
1920 deaths
American male stage actors
American male film actors
American male silent film actors
20th-century American male actors
Male actors from Vermont
People from Swanton (town), Vermont